Hooge en Lage Zwaluwe was a municipality in the Dutch province of North Brabant. It included the villages of Lage Zwaluwe, and Hooge Zwaluwe.

Hooge en Lage Zwaluwe existed until 1997, when it merged with Made.

References

Municipalities of the Netherlands disestablished in 1997
Former municipalities of North Brabant
Drimmelen